Nguyễn Minh Hải (born 9 January 1994) is a Vietnamese footballer who plays as a defender for V.League 2 club Đồng Tháp.

Honours

Club
Hà Nội F.C.
V.League 1: 
 Winners :       2016
 Runners-up : 2015
 Third place : 2017
Vietnamese Super Cup: 
 Runners-up :  2015, 2016
Vietnamese National Cup: 
 Runners-up : 2015, 2016

References 

1994 births
Living people
Vietnamese footballers
Association football defenders
V.League 1 players
Hanoi FC players